Marash is the Armenian and Arabic name of Kahramanmaraş, a city in Turkey.

Marash may also refer to:

Places
Marash Eyalet, an eyalet of the Ottoman Empire
Merash, or Marash, Iran
Varosha, Famagusta, Turkish Maraş or Kapalı Maraş, an abandoned southern quarter of the Cypriot city of Famagusta
Maraşlı, Karaisalı, a village in the District of Karaisalı, Adana Province, Turkey
Marash Peak, the peak rising to 800 m in the southeast foothills of Detroit Plateau on Nordenskjöld Coast in Graham Land, Antarctica

People

People of Marash
Baldwin of Marash, Crusader baron in Northern Syria in the 12th century AD
Thoros of Marash, also known as Thatoul, father of Arda of Armenia, the first queen consort of the Kingdom of Jerusalem

Given name
Marash Kumbulla (born 2000), an Albanian professional footballer

Surname
Dave Marash, known as Dave Marash (born 1942), American television journalist known for his work at ABC News and Al Jazeera English

See also
Maraş massacre (Turkish: Maraş katliamı), massacre of about one hundred left-wing activists in the city of Kahramanmaraş
Marashis, an Iranian Shiʿite dynasty ruling in Mazandaran from 1359 to 1596
Nork-Marash District
Battle of Marash (disambiguation)
Maraş (disambiguation)